Khoelenya is a community council located in the Mohale's Hoek District of Lesotho. Its population in 2006 was 22,424.

Villages
The community of Khoelenya includes the villages of

BolometsaBraakfonteinHa 'MamajoroHa Bereng MatsohoHa Bereng Matsoho (Bohareng)Ha Bereng Matsoho (Bohareng)Ha Bereng Matsoho (Ha Tanausi)Ha Bereng Matsoho (Letlapeng)Ha Bereng Matsoho (Mantjelebeng)Ha Bereng Matsoho (Soaeng)Ha FakoHa ForosemetheHa JoboHa K'heisaraHa KaleleHa KibeHa LaesetokoHa MahaseHa MakhabaneHa MakhaolaHa MakhisaHa MakhubeHa MakoanyaneHa MakoetlaneHa MakoiliHa MalatsaHa ManeHa MaphomaHa MatlhakeliHa MohlakanaHa MoiloaHa MokotsoHa Mor'a-ThabaHa Morabe

Ha MorieHa MosheHa MoteeHa MothebesoaneHa MotloheloaHa MotobekiHa NchochoHa NkauHa Nkau (Lithakong)Ha NkhethelengHa NkhoroaneHa NtabanyaneHa NthamaHa PeliHa PutsoaHa QoaneHa RabeleHa Rabele (Moselinyane)Ha RakoloiHa RamatlallaHa RamokaseHa RamololiHa RankaliHa RashabaHa RobitaHa SekatleHa SelibaHa SelloHa SetotomaHa SouruHa TaleHa TeliteHa Thabane (Ha Tšehla)Ha Thetso

Ha TomaseHa TšehlaHa TšenoliKhohloanengKhohlongKhohlong (Ha Sethunya)KhorongKhothometsaneLekhalongLekhalong (Ha Litaba)LekhoarengLibataolongLikoaengMaisengMajakanengMajoe-MasoeuMakhalengManyarelengMaphutsanengMaphutsaneng (Aupolasi)MarabengMarabeng (Bluegum)Marabeng (Ha Michael)Marabeng (Lekhalong)MasunyanengMatebelengMatlalengMatlapanengMatlapaneng (Ha Makoili)Matlapaneng (Lihaboreng)Matlapaneng (Litenteng)MeritingMetsi-MasooanaMoeaneng

Mohloka-KoboMorifi (Ha Khosi)Morifi (Ha Mokhoenyana)MoselinyaneMotse-MochaMotse-Mocha (Ha Soko)MpharaneNgopeng-la-NtjaPhatlallaPhuthingPhuthing (Thibella)PolatengPoqaQhalasingQoqotho (Mafikalisiu)RisefengSeabelaSebetlanengSebetlengSetantengSethalengTaungThabana-BosuluThabana-TšooanaThabanengThota-MoliThotanengTolobankaTsanana (Ha Rabotsetse)TsekongTsoapo-le-bolilaTsoatingWaterfallWhite City

References

External links
 Google map of community villages

Populated places in Mohale's Hoek District